Red Devil Dawn (2003) is the third studio album recorded by the indie rock band Crooked Fingers. Released by Merge Records in January 2003, Red Devil Dawn is the follow-up to 2001's Bring On the Snakes and is the first album released by Crooked Fingers on Merge.

Track listing
"Big Darkness" - 4:40
"Don't Say a Word" - 5:11
"You Can Never Leave" - 3:49
"Bad Man Coming" - 3:24
"You Threw a Spark" - 3:16
"A Boy with (100) Hands" - 4:11
"Sweet Marie" - 4:55
"Angelina" - 3:31
"Disappear" - 4:16
"Carrion Doves" - 3:58

References

2003 albums
Crooked Fingers albums
Merge Records albums